Bakarganj may refer to:

 Backergunje, a former district of British India now located mostly in Bangladesh
 Bakarganj, Bangladesh, a Upazila in Bangladesh